The Politburo, Secretariat and Orgburo of the 9th Congress of the Russian Communist Party (Bolsheviks) were elected by the 1st Plenary Session of the 9th Central Committee, in the immediate aftermath of the 9th Congress.

9th Politburo

9th Secretariat

9th Orgburo

Full members

Candidate members

References

Politburo of the Central Committee of the Communist Party of the Soviet Union members
Members of the Orgburo of the Central Committee of the Communist Party of the Soviet Union
Secretariat of the Central Committee of the Communist Party of the Soviet Union members
Politburo
Politburo
Politburo
Politburo